Donar is an Old High German name for the Germanic thunder god, known to the Norse as Thor.

Donar may also refer to:

Donar (basketball club), a professional basketball club based in Groningen, Netherlands
Johan Donar, a Swedish tennis player
a version of the Artillery Gun Module, a German self-propelled howitzer
2176 Donar, a minor planet
Donar Fluctus, an area of lava flow on Jupiter's moon Io
German trawler V 5113 Donar, a German ship of World War II
a web platform developed by Fundación Ciudadano Inteligente, a Chilean non-profit organization
a character in the Starz TV series Spartacus

See also
Donor
Doner (disambiguation)
Donner (disambiguation)